"Too Shy" is a song written and recorded by English band Kajagoogoo, released in January 1983. The first single from their debut album White Feathers, the song was an immediate hit and reached number one on the UK Singles Chart for two weeks. It was also very successful in other European countries and Japan, spending five weeks at number one in Germany, also reaching number one in Belgium and Ireland, as well as reaching number two in France and Switzerland, and number four in Sweden, Austria and the Netherlands.

Assisted by heavy rotation on MTV, the song later became a success in the United States, peaking at number 5 on the Billboard Hot 100. "Too Shy" is Kajagoogoo's only significant hit in the US, where the band is widely regarded as a one-hit wonder. In the UK, however, Kajagoogoo had further hits, including two more top 10 singles: "Ooh to Be Ah" and "Big Apple", both in 1983.

Production
"Too Shy" was written by Kajagoogoo and produced by Duran Duran keyboardist Nick Rhodes and Colin Thurston, the latter of whom had produced Duran Duran's first two albums. In 2006, "Too Shy" was ranked number 27 on VH1's 100 Greatest Songs of the 80's and number 9 on VH1's 100 Greatest One Hit Wonders of the 80s.

Music video
The music video directed by Simon Milne, cast model Carolyn Espley (later wife of Dennis Miller) as a waitress cleaning up a nightclub at the end of the night. As the band performs the song on the club stage, she has visions of dancers from different eras populating the dance floor.

Chart performance
The song was an immediate hit, topping the UK Singles Chart for two weeks. It was also very successful in other European countries, spending five weeks at number one in Germany, and reaching number two in Switzerland, and number four in Sweden, Austria and the Netherlands. The song was also a top 10 hit in the United States during the summer of 1983.

The 12" maxi single's B-side, "Take Another View", a non-album track, often performed live, was included on the 2004 re-issue of White Feathers, which contained several bonus tracks, including the instrumental version of "Too Shy", originally featured on the B-sides of both the 7" and 12" singles.

Weekly charts

Year-end charts

Certifications and sales

Appearances
The song can also be heard in the Rockstar video game Grand Theft Auto: Vice City Stories, played on the in-game radio station Wave 103. It also appears as a collectable cassette tape in Metal Gear Solid V: The Phantom Pain. A Simlish version of the song is also featured in The Sims 2 expansion pack, The Sims 2: Open for Business. The song also features in the Black Mirror interactive film Bandersnatch on Netflix.

See also
List of number-one hits of 1983 (Germany)
List of number-one singles of 1983 (Ireland)
List of UK Singles Chart number ones of the 1980s

References

1983 songs
1983 debut singles
1992 singles
EMI America Records singles
EMI Records singles
Bellaphon Records singles
Irish Singles Chart number-one singles
Kajagoogoo songs
Number-one singles in Germany
Oricon International Singles Chart number-one singles
Song recordings produced by Colin Thurston
UK Singles Chart number-one singles
Ultratop 50 Singles (Flanders) number-one singles